Billie Lee Turner may refer to:
 Billie Lee Turner (botanist) (born 1925), American botanist
 Billie Lee Turner II (born 1945), his son, American geographer